Thomas Shaw, 3rd Baron Craigmyle KStJ, (17 November 1923 – 30 April 1998) was a British aristocrat, a prominent convert to Roman Catholicism and a philanthropist.

Early life
Thomas Donald Mackay Shaw, The (3rd) Lord Craigmyle, was the son of the 2nd Baron Craigmyle and born on 17 November 1923.

He was educated at Eton and Trinity College, Oxford, obtaining a Master of Arts degree. In 1943, he became a sub-lieutenant in the Royal Navy Volunteer Reserve, serving until 1946.

Personal life
In 1955 he married the artist Anthea Esther Christine Rich (1933-2016), daughter of Canon Edward Rich. She grew up in Chiswick, studied at the Chelsea School of Art, before travelling to India where she met Lord Craigmyle.  They were married in St James's, Spanish Place, London, in 1955. He followed his wife in converting to Roman Catholicism in 1956.

They had four sons and three daughters. 
Their second son The Hon Thomas Columba Shaw is the current (4th) Baron Craigmyle.  Their youngest son Joseph Shaw is the current chairman of the Latin Mass Society.

Craigmyle struggled with alcoholism, and following his recovery committed much of his time and wealth to charitable work helping addicts, the homeless and the destitute.

Career
He was chairman of Craigmyle & Co Ltd, and Claridge Mills Ltd, and director of Inchape & C Ltd. Clubs: Royal Thames Yacht Club, Caledonian Club, Bengal (Calcutta). Membership of other associations: Royal Society of Arts (FRSA), Venerable Order of Saint John (CStJ), and President of the British Association of the Sovereign Order of Malta.

Lord Craigmyle was "one of Britain's most philanthropic Roman Catholic laymen. A convert...with a deep piety and astonishing personal generosity, to the great benefit of the numerous causes he supported" [quoted from his obituary in The Times, 8 May 1998].

He died on 30 April 1998.

Honours and awards
 Bailiff Grand Cross of Honour and Devotion of the Sovereign Military Order of Malta
 Fellow of the Royal Society of Arts (F.R.S.A.)
 Knight of the Most Venerable Order of the Hospital of St. John of Jerusalem (K.St.J.) (1989)
 Knight Commander with Star of the Order of Pius IX (1993)

References

External links
 Thomas Donald Mackay Shaw, 3rd Baron Craigmyle
 Obituary, The Independent, by G. Noel, ref. the 3rd Baron Craigmyle
Obituary in The Herald

1923 births
1998 deaths
People educated at Eton College
Alumni of Trinity College, Oxford
British philanthropists
Converts to Roman Catholicism from Anglicanism
Royal Naval Volunteer Reserve personnel of World War II
Barons in the Peerage of the United Kingdom
Bailiffs Grand Cross of Honour and Devotion of the Sovereign Military Order of Malta
Knights of the Order of St John
Knights Commander with Star of the Order of Pope Pius IX